Tadiandamol or Thadiyandamol  is the highest mountain of Madikeri taluk Kodagu district, Karnataka, India. It is the third highest peak in Karnataka, after Mullayyanagiri & Kudremukha. It is located Western Ghats range, and reaches an elevation of 1,748 m.  The mountain has patches of shola forests in the valleys.

The Nalaknad (also known as Nalnad - meaning 4 villages) palace at the foothills is an important historical landmark. This was one of the landmarks mapped during the Great Trigonometric Survey.

It is a place of interest for trekkers and naturalists. The climb to the top and back can be completed as a day hike; camping is banned since December 2016.

Etymology

The name Tadiandamol literally means largest base (thadi = broad, large, huge; anda = belonging to (possessive) in Kodava; mol = hill, base, peak). It loosely means Tallest Mount, and the name also could translate as Broad Hill.

See also
 Virajpet
 Madikeri
 Mangalore
 Bhagamandala

References

External links

Mountains of Karnataka
Geography of Kodagu district
Tourist attractions in Kodagu district